In mathematics, a lexicographical or lexicographic product may be formed of
 graphs – see lexicographic product of graphs
 orders – see lexicographical order